Presses de l'Université Laval (PUL) is a university press founded in 1950 and associated with Université Laval, located in Quebec City, Canada. Presses de l'Université Laval is a member of the Association of Canadian University Presses.

See also

 List of university presses

References

External links 
Les Presses de l'Université Laval

Presses de l'Université Laval
University presses of Canada